R.B. Swift is an American journalist, working as the Harrisburg, Pennsylvania bureau chief for the Times-Shamrock Communications newspapers.

The Pennsylvania Report named him to the 2009 "The Pennsylvania Report 100" list of influential figures in Pennsylvania politics, calling him a "pre-eminent Harrisburg political journalist." He is a frequent guest on Pennsylvania Cable Network's "Journalists Roundtable" television program.

References

Living people
Writers from Harrisburg, Pennsylvania
Pennsylvania political journalists
American newspaper reporters and correspondents
Year of birth missing (living people)